Bayanan is a barangay in the Muntinlupa, Philippines. The total land area of the barangay is 0.784 km2 which is the second smallest land area in the city. It has a population of 35,392.

Bayanan is located south of Manila. It is bounded on the north by the Muntinlupa Barangay of Alabang, on the south by the Muntinlupa barangay of Putatan, and on the east by Laguna de Bay.

History

Bayanan is said to be named after the báyan plant that is grows in the area.

Subdivisions
While barangays are the administrative divisions of the city, and are legally part of the addresses of establishments and homes, residents also include their subdivision. Listed below are subdivisions in this barangay.

 Almanville Subdivision
 Pleasant Homes Subdivision	
 Filrizan Subdivision	
 Summit Circle	
 Summit Homes
 Sunrise Subdivision

References

External links
http://muntinlupacity.gov.ph/

Muntinlupa
Barangays of Metro Manila